"(Now and Then There's) A Fool Such as I" is a popular song written by Bill Trader and was published in 1952. Recorded as a single by Hank Snow it peaked at number four on the US country charts  early in 1953.

Since the original Snow version, "Fool Such as I"—as the song is sometimes known—has been recorded and released as singles several times, by artists as diverse as Jo Stafford, Elvis Presley, Bob Dylan, and Baillie & the Boys.

Other versions

Tommy Edwards
The Tommy Edwards version reached number 13 on the Cash Box survey. Listed a co-best-seller with the Jo Stafford version, it lasted 11 weeks in their chart.

Jo Stafford
The recording by Jo Stafford was released by Columbia Records as catalog number 39930. It reached the Billboard Best Seller chart on February 28, 1953, at number twenty, its only week on the chart.

Petula Clark
Petula Clark's French language version titled "Prends mon Coeur", was more successful in France (number 9, 1960) than Presley's version.

Bob Dylan
In 1967, Bob Dylan recorded the song during the Basement Tape sessions. For many years never officially released, the recording had been widely bootlegged, and was finally released November 4, 2014, on The Bootleg Series Vol. 11: The Basement Tapes Complete. Dylan recorded the song again in April 1969; that version was released in 1973 by Columbia on the Dylan album. On the 1973 Dylan album and several associated Columbia 1973 singles, the song is wrongly credited to "B. Abner" and "LeFevre Sing Pub Co (BMI)". This is a different song with the same title, written by Buford Abner of the Swanee River Boys. This mistake has not been corrected, and on www.bobdylan.com the song is still credited to "B. Abner".

Rodney Crowell 
Rodney Crowell covered the song in 1979. The release was not a success, peaking at No. 90 in the Billboard country charts. It was his second charting single after "Elvira" in the previous year which barely scraped the bottom of the charts as well. Both songs were included in his debut album Ain't Living Long Like This.

Baillie & the Boys

In 1990, Baillie & the Boys released the song from the band's album The Lights of Home. This version, released under the title "Fool Such as I", peaked at No. 5 on the Billboard Hot Country Singles chart. It was the trio's last Top 10 hit on the country charts.

Slim Whitman
Whitman also recorded his own country version on the Imperial Records label in 1959.

The Smiths
The Smiths recorded a cover based on Elvis's rendition in February 1987 at Firehouse Studios in Streatham it was meant to be used as a b-side to a single from Strangeways Here We Come. As of 2023 the song remains unreleased

Elvis Presley version

A recording by Elvis Presley was a platinum record. Initially released as B-side to "I Need Your Love Tonight", it reached number one in the UK as an A-side single. Presley's recording reached number two in the United States.

The song was recorded on June 10, 1958, at RCA's Studio B, Nashville, while Presley was on leave from the Army. The recording featured guitar by Hank Garland, Chet Atkins and Presley, bass by Bob Moore, drums by D. J. Fontana and Buddy Harman and piano by Floyd Cramer and backing vocal by the Jordanaires, with the bass voice provided by Ray Walker.
It reached number sixteen on the R&B charts.

Chart performance

Elvis Presley

Baillie & the Boys

Year-end charts

References

External links
I Need Your Love Tonight / (Now and Then There's) A Fool Such As I Guide part of The Elvis Presley Record Research Database

1952 songs
1953 singles
1959 singles
1969 singles
1990 singles
Number-one singles in Australia
Number-one singles in Scotland
UK Singles Chart number-one singles
Hank Snow songs
Elvis Presley songs
Bob Dylan songs
Jo Stafford songs
Rodney Crowell songs
Baillie & the Boys songs
Tommy Edwards songs
Petula Clark songs
Slim Whitman songs
Song recordings produced by Kyle Lehning
RCA Records singles